The Regionalist Party (PR) was a political party in Portugal.

History
The party was established in 1921 and supported regional autonomy for the Beira region. It won two seats in the 1921 elections, and retained both seats in the 1922 elections.

References

Defunct political parties in Portugal
Political parties established in 1921
1921 establishments in Portugal